Michal Straka (born April 20, 1971) is a Czech former professional ice hockey centre. He is the older brother of former NHL player Martin Straka.

Straka played in the Czechoslovak First Ice Hockey League and the Czech Extraliga for HC Plzeň, HC Bílí Tygři Liberec, HC Znojemští Orli and HC Karlovy Vary. He also played in the SM-liiga for Lukko and the Tipsport Liga for MsHK Žilina.

References

External links

1971 births
Living people
HC Berounští Medvědi players
HC Bílí Tygři Liberec players
Cleveland Lumberjacks players
Czech ice hockey centres
HC Karlovy Vary players
Lukko players
Orli Znojmo players
HC Plzeň players
HC Tábor players
MsHK Žilina players
Czech expatriate ice hockey players in the United States
Czech expatriate ice hockey players in Finland
Czech expatriate ice hockey players in Slovakia